Ornipholidotos sylviae is a butterfly in the family Lycaenidae. It is found in Ivory Coast and Ghana. The habitat consists of forests.

References

Butterflies described in 2005
Taxa named by Michel Libert
Ornipholidotos